Trunk may refer to:

Biology
 Trunk (anatomy), synonym for torso
 Trunk (botany), a tree's central superstructure
 Trunk of corpus callosum, in neuroanatomy
 Elephant trunk, the proboscis of an elephant

Computing
 Trunk (software), in revision control
 Trunk line, a system of shared network access
 VLAN, which uses a trunk port

Entertainment and media
 Trunk (album), 2013 album by Ulf Lundell
 The Trunk, a 1961 British film
 "The Trunk" (The Twilight Zone), a television episode
 Trunk Records, a record label

Physical containers
 Trunk (car), a large storage compartment
 Trunk (luggage)
 Trunk (motorcycle), a storage compartment

Other uses
 Trunk (surname), a German-language surname
 Trunk road, a major road
 Trunk shot, a cinematic shot from within a car trunk
 Trunk show, a merchandising event

See also
Trunking (auto), riding in trunk or boot
Trunks (disambiguation)
Elephant's trunk (disambiguation)